Decoglurant (INN) (code name RG1578, RO4995819) is a negative allosteric modulator of the mGlu2 and mGlu3 receptors which was under development by Roche for the adjunctive treatment of major depressive disorder. Decoglurant progressed as far as phase II clinical trials but was ultimately discontinued from further development due to disappointing efficacy results.

See also
 Basimglurant
 RO4491533

References

External links
 Decoglurant – AdisInsight – Springer

Abandoned drugs
MGlu2 receptor antagonists
MGlu3 receptor antagonists
Trifluoromethyl compounds
Alkyne derivatives
Aminopyridines